Broks (feminine (Latvian): Broka). is a surname. Notable people with the surname include:

 Paul Broks, English neuropsychologist and science writer
 Raivis Broks (born 1984), Latvian bobsledder
 Rolands Broks (born 1969), Latvian politician
 Stef Broks (born 1981), Dutch drummer

See also
 Brok (disambiguation)
 Brocks (disambiguation)

Latvian-language masculine surnames